The 1978 United States Senate election in Tennessee took place on November 7, as a part of the Senate class 2 election.

Situation 

Two-term popular incumbent Howard Baker, who had served as United States Senate Minority Leader since 1977, ran for reelection against first-time candidate and Democratic Party activist Jane Eskind.

Democratic nomination 

Candidates:
 Jame Boyd
 Walter Bradley
 Former State Senate Majority Leader Bill Bruce
 Jane Eskind
 James Foster
 Douglas L. Heinsohn
 J. D. Lee
 Virginia Nyabongo
 Charles Gordon Vick

In the primary, held on August 3, Eskind won in an open primary against eight other candidates:

 Eskind – 196,156 (34.52%)
 Bruce – 170,795 (30.06%)
 Lee – 89,939 (15.83%)
 Boyd – 48,458 (8.53%)
 Bradley – 22,130 (3.90%)
 Heinsohn – 17,787 (3.13%)
 Foster – 10,671 (1.88%)
 Nyabongo – 7,682 (1.35%)
 Vick – 4,414 (0.78%)
 Write-in – 147 (0.03%)

Republican nomination 

Candidates:
 Incumbent United States Senator and Senate Minority Leader Howard Baker
 J. Durelle Boles
 Harvey Howard
 Hubert David Patty
 Dayton Seiler
 Francis Trapp

In the primary, held on August 3, Baker easily emerged as the winner:

 Baker – 205,680 (83.44%)
 Howard – 21,154 (8.58%)
 Boles – 8,899 (3.61%)
 Patty – 3,941 (1.60%)
 Seiler – 3,831 (1.55%)
 Trapp – 2,994 (1.22%)

General election 

Baker won with a 15-point margin in the general election, held on November 7:

See also 
 1978 United States Senate elections

References 

1978
Tennessee
United States Senate